Ciccone is a family name of Italian origin and may refer to:

People with the surname
 Angelo Ciccone (born 1980), Italian cyclist
 Anna Maria Ciccone (1892–1965), Italian physicist
 Anthony "Sonny" Ciccone (born 1934), New York mobster
 Ben Ciccone (1909–1990), American football player
 Diego Ciccone (born 1987), Swiss footballer
 Don Ciccone (1946–2016), American musician
 Enrico Ciccone (born 1970), former ice hockey player
 Frank Ciccone (born 1947), American politician
 Giulio Ciccone (born 1994), Italian racing cyclist
 James Ciccone (born 1960), American character actor
 Madonna Louise Ciccone (born 1958), American singer known mononymously as Madonna
 Nicola Ciccone, Canadian singer
 Nicola Ciccone (footballer) (born 1996), Italian football player
 Raff Ciccone (born 1983), Australian politician
 Valerio Ciccone (born 1970), Australian artist

Fictional characters
 Janet Ciccone, a character on the daytime soap opera As The World Turns
 Liberty Ciccone, a character on the daytime soap opera As The World Turns

Other uses
 Ciccone (band), a London-based indie band
 Ciccone, Northern Territory, a suburb of Alice Springs, Australia
 Ciclone-class torpedo boat

See also
 Cicones, a Homeric Thracian tribe
 

Italian-language surnames